This is a list of singles that have peaked in the Top 10 of the Billboard Hot 100 during 1992. TLC, Boyz II Men, Mariah Carey, En Vogue, and Michael Jackson each had three top-ten hits in 1992, tying them for the most top-ten hits during the year.

Fifteen songs spent twelve weeks or more in the top 10, the first to do so since early 1984. "End of the Road" spent a then-record 19 weeks in the top 10 in a single chart run, alongside a record 13-week stay at number one.

Top-ten singles

1991 peaks

1993 peaks

See also
 1992 in music
 List of Hot 100 number-one singles of 1992 (U.S.)
 Billboard Year-End Hot 100 singles of 1992

References

General sources

Joel Whitburn Presents the Billboard Hot 100 Charts: The Nineties
Additional information obtained can be verified within Billboard's online archive services and print editions of the magazine.

1992
United States Hot 100 Top 10